OBT may refer to:

 OpenBitTorrent
 Opportunities for a Better Tomorrow
 Oregon Ballet Theatre
 Orange Blossom Trail, a road in Osceola and Orange Counties, Florida
 Orange Baboon Tarantula, also known as Pterinochilus murinus
 .OBT, a filename extension used by Microsoft Binder